Schell is an extinct town in Garnett County, Maryland and Mineral County, West Virginia, United States.

History
A post office called Schell was established in 1883 on the West Virginia side, where it remained in operation until it was discontinued in 1931. The community most likely was named after Augustus Schell, a New York politician and lawyer.

References

Geography of Garrett County, Maryland
Geography of Mineral County, West Virginia